Trasandino de Los Andes are a Chilean Football club, their home town is Los Andes in  the V Región of Valparaíso in Chile. They currently play in the Segunda División.

The club was founded on April 1, 1906. Between 1985 and 1992 the club was called Cobreandino. Their home games are played at the Regional stadium, which has a capacity of 3,313.

Titles
Primera B: 1
1985
Tercera División: 1
2012
Cuarta División: 1
1992

Current squad 2016–17

See also
Chilean football league system
Unión San Felipe

External links
 http://trasandinodelosandes.cl/ Club Deportivo Trasandino de Los Andes] 

1906 establishments in Chile
Association football clubs established in 1906
Football clubs in Chile
Sport in Valparaíso Region
Trasandino de Los Andes